Parahepialiscus is a monotypic moth genus of the family Hepialidae. The only described species is P. borneensis of Borneo.

References

External links
Hepialidae genera

Moths described in 1933
Hepialidae
Taxa named by Pierre Viette
Monotypic moth genera
Exoporia genera
Moths of Asia